Savantvadi State, also spelt Sawantwadi ruled by the Sawant Bhonsale dynasty was one of the non-salute Maratha princely states during the British Raj. It was the only state belonging to the Kolaba Agency under the Bombay Presidency, which became later part of the Deccan States Agency. Its capital was at Sawantwadi, in the present-day Sindhudurg district of Maharashtra.

Sawantvadi State measured 438 square kilometers in area. According to the 1931 census, the population was 250,589. The official language of the inhabitants of the state was Marathi while the local language is Malvani

History                        
               
Sawantwadi state was founded in 1627 by Khem Sawant I, later becoming a vassal state of the Sultanate of Bijapur. Khem Sawant II made Sundarwadi his capital which later got the name of Sawantwadi as the rulers were known as Sawants. 

The Sawant dynasty, the head of the Sawantwadi State, arrived in the province in the 16th century. This dynasty ruled over South Konkan for a long time. Their career is full of bravery. 

These families are considered to be the kings of the Sun dynasty. 

Mang Sawant of this family was the first to come here in South Konkan. He is considered to be the progenitor of the Sawantwadi dynasty. He came to this province with the army of King of Vijayanagar. 

Initially, he was stationed 
at Gandharvagad in Chandgad taluka for some time. Therefore, he was also known as Chandgudhadhipati. 
After coming to Konkan, he first established his stronghold at Hodawade (Tal. Vengurle). He defeated the local chiefs who had influence in the area at that time. His fame gradually spread in the province. In the previous part, the same Mang Sawant has been referred to as having a conflict with the Lord of Kudaldesha who dominates this part.

In 1580, Mang Sawant and Kudaldeshastha Prabhu's general Dev Dalvi jointly declared war on Kudal province. The purpose behind this was to establish the power of the Marathas. The lord of Kudal got help from the emperor of Bijapur. Mang Sawant was killed in a battle between the two armies at Hodawade. 
It had some fortified hills, such as Manohar and Mansantosh.
On 7 April 1765 Savantvadi State became a British protectorate.

Sawantwadi acceded to the Dominion of India on 15 August 1947, becoming part of Bombay State in 1948.

Rulers
 Mang Savant (1554) - He revolted from Bijapur, tried to establish himself as an independent chief in Hodavda village near Sawantwadi. He defeated the Bijapur troops sent against him and was independent till his death. Mang's successors again became feudatories of the Bijapur kings.
 Khem Savant I (1627 - 1640) - On the decline of Bijapur power, Phond Savant's son Khem Savant, who held part of the Vadi country in grant, jaghir, made himself independent.
Som Savant (1640 - 1641) - Khem Savant was succeeded by his son Som Savant and ruled for only 18 months and later his brother, Lakham Savant succeeded him.
Lakham Savant (1641 - 1665) - He, in a predatory incursion, made captive the Desai of Kudal, put him to death, and seized his lands. When Shivaji's power increased (1650), Lakham Savant offered him his allegiance. Shivaji made him Sar Desai of the whole south Konkan. He din't abide by the terms of the treaty (1659) and joined Bijapur Sultanate. In 1660, Shivaji sent one of his earliest followers, Baji Phasalkar. He fought a drawn battle with Lakham's commander Kay Savant. Both were slain in the battle. In 1662, Shivaji defeated Lakham. From political and family motives, for the Savants like himself belonged to the Bhonsla family, Shivaji reinstated Lakham.
Phond Savant (1665 - 1675) - Lakham was succeeded by his brother Phond Savant.

Title Raja Sar Desai
1675 – Feb 1709            Khem Savant II Bhonsle              (b. 16.. – d. 1709) - He helped Mughals against Shivaji and in return got more territory from them.
Feb 1709 –  2 Jan 1738     Phond Savant II Bhonsle             (b. 1667 – d. 1738)
 2 Jan 1738 – 1755         Ramachandra Savant I Bhonsle        (b. 1712 – d. 1755)
 2 Jan 1738 – 1753         Jayram Sawant Bhonsle – Regent      (d. 1753)
1755 – 1763                Khem Savant III Bhonsle             (b. 1749 – d. 1803)
1755 – 1763                Soubhagyavati Janaki Bai Bhonsle (f) – Regent

Title Raja Bahadur 
1763 –  6 Oct 1803         Khem Savant III (s.a.) - He received RajaBahadur Title from Delhi Badshah Shaha alam on recommendation of Jivbadada Kerkar & Mahadji Shinde. 

 6 Oct 1803 – 1805         Rani Lakshmi Bai (f) – Regent        (b. 17.. – d. 1807)  
1805 – 1807                Ramachandra Savant II "Bhau Saheb"   (b. 17.. – d. 1809)
1807 – 1808                Phond Savant II                      (d. 1808)
1808 –  3 Oct 1812         Phond Savant III                     (b. 17.. – d. 1812)
1807 – 1808                Rani Durga Bai (f) – Regent          (d. 1819) (1st time) 
 3 Oct 1812 – 1867         Khem Savant IV "Bapu Saheb"          (b. 1804 – d. 1867)
 3 Oct 1812 – 28 Dec 1818  Rani Durga Bai (f) – Regent          (s.a.) (2nd time) 
28 Dec 1818 – 11 Feb 1823  Regents 
 – Rani Savitri Bai Raje (f)
 – Rani Narmada Bai (f)                (b. 1783 – d. 1849)
1867 –  7 Mar 1869         Phond Savant IV "Bapu Saheb"         (b. 1828 – d. 1869)
 7 Mar 1869 – Dec 1899     Raghunath Savant "Baba Saheb"        (b. 1862 – d. 1899) 
 7 Mar 1869 – c.1880       .... -Regent
Dec 1899 – 23 Apr 1913     Shriram Savant "Aba Saheb"               (b. 1871 – d. 1913) 
Dec 1899 – 17 Jun 1900     .... -Regent
24 Apr 1913 –  4 Jul 1937  Khem Savant V "Bapu Saheb"           (b. 1897 – d. 1937) (from 4 Jun 1934, Sir Khem Savant V)
 (Eldest Son of Khem Savant went to England Radhakrishna Samant (Savant)) lost claim to throne
24 Apr 1913 – 29 Oct 1924  Rani Gajara Bai Raje (f) – Regent    (b. 1887 – d. 19..)
 4 Jul 1937 – 15 Aug 1947  Shivramraje Savant Bhonsle                  (b. 1927 – d. 1995)
 4 Jul 1937 – 12 May 1947  Rani Parvati Bai Raje (f) – Regent   (b. 1907 – d. 1961)
The Present Head of the family is His Highness Khem Sawant VI. The erstwhile royal family is now striving hard to promote and carry forward the legacy of art of Ganjifa and Lacquer ware which was once revived by His Highness Lt. Col. Shivramraje Sawant Bhonsle and Her Highness Satvashiladevi Bhonsle in the Sawantwadi Palace. They are also coming up with a boutique hotel whose centre theme revolves around the Dashavtar Ganjifa.

See also
 Maratha
 Maratha Empire
 List of Maratha dynasties and states
 Maratha titles
 Political integration of India

References
4.  

https://www.esakal.com/kokan/sawant-bhosale-family-history-konkan-sindhudurg-404266

External links

Princely states of India
Bombay Presidency
History of Maharashtra
Sindhudurg district
Konkan
Sawantwadi
1627 establishments in India
1948 disestablishments in India